Triptolemos (Ancient Greek: Τριπτόλεμος) is a lost play of Sophocles.  It was one of the plays which he produced in 468 BC for the City Dionysia, the year he first won the prize for tragedy at the festival.  Though the play is usually assumed to have been a tragedy, this is not certain, and it might instead have been a satyr play.  The plot of the play is not known, though it probably centered around Triptolemos' mission to bring the art of agriculture to Greece.
Fragments of the lost play still remain.

References

Works cited
 
 

Lost plays
Plays based on classical mythology
Triptolemos
Satyr plays